Ceaușu may refer to:

 Ceaușu, the old name of the Râmnicelu village, Buzău County, Romania
 Alexandru Ceaușu (born 1980), Romanian sprint canoer who competed in the early to mid-2000s.
 Marin Ceaușu (1891–1954), Romanian Brigadier-General during World War II

See also 
 Ceaușescu (surname)

Romanian-language surnames